The College of Economics and Management (CEM) is one of the eleven degree-granting units of the University of the Philippines Los Baños. It is the first in Asia to offer degree programs in Agricultural Economics and has trained agricultural, resource and environmental economists from all over the continent.

CEM is composed of four departments - the Department of Agricultural Economics, Department of Economics, Department of Agribusiness Management and Entrepreneurship, and the Institute of Cooperatives and Bio-Enterprise Development (ICOPED). Also affiliated with the college is the Agribusiness Center for Entrepreneurs and the Asia-Pacific Economic Cooperation Center for Technology Exchange and Training for Small and Medium Enterprises (ACTETSME).

History

The College traces its roots from the Institute of Agricultural Development and Administration under the  College of Agriculture in 1975 with three Departments - Agricultural Economics, Economics, and Management. It later became the College of Development Economics and Management which merged IADA with the Agricultural Credit and Cooperative Studies and the Agrarian Reform Institute in 1978.

UPLB Agribusiness Management and Entrepreneurship (DAME) 

The first undergraduate program in Agribusiness was established at the UP College of Agriculture in Los Baños, Philippines as Bachelor of Science in Agriculture major in Agribusiness in 1966. The program was initially a joint undertaking with the UP College of Business Administration in Diliman, Quezon City until 1975. In 1969, a seminar titled "Advanced Agribusiness Management" was held in Manila which led to Jose D. Drilon publishing the book "Agribusiness Management Resource Materials," the foundation of current agribusiness programs around the world.

Drilon further expanded the concept of agribusiness to include coordinators for agribusiness structure and policy such as governments and research institutions in his 1971 book. Goldberg meanwhile added other coordinators such as schools, financial institutions, and cooperatives. D.K. Desai (1973) attempted to integrate all the entities and sectors within agribusiness and called it the Agribusiness System.

In 1975, the newly created Institute of Agricultural Development and Administration (now CEM) assumed sole administration of the program. The program was officially recognized as B.S. in Agricultural Business in 1978. In June 1983, the program was renamed B.S. in Agribusiness Management then in 2017 B.S. in Agribusiness Management and Entrepreneurship.

Faculty (selected)

 Corazon Aragon (PhD University of Hawaii)
 Jefferson Arapoc (PhD University of Newcastle, Australia)
 Joseph V. Balagtas (PhD Purdue; Visiting Professor)
 Agnes Banzon (PhD Monash University)
 Amelia Bello (MA University of Hawaii)
 Jose DV. Camacho (PhD Kyoto University)
 Gideon Carnaje (PhD UP Diliman)
 Ma. Angeles Catelo (PhD Nagoya University)
 Salvador Catelo (PhD Kyoto University)
 Achilles Costales (PhD UPLB)
 Agham Cuevas (PhD UP Diliman)
 Julieta A. Delos Reyes (MS UPLB)
 Marilyn M. Elauria (MS Purdue)
 Danilo Evangelista (MS Australian National University)
 Herminia Francisco (PhD UPLB)
 Yolanda Garcia (PhD UPLB)
 Prudenciano Gordoncillo (PhD Victoria University of Technology)
 Cielito Habito (PhD Harvard; Professorial Lecturer)
 Romeo Huelgas (MA UP Diliman)
 Leodegario Ilag (PhD Purdue)
 Flordeliza Lantican (PhD Colorado State University)
 Cezar Brian Mamaril (PhD Virginia Tech)
 Alessando Manilay (MS Kansas State University)
 Paciencia Manuel (PhD University of Idaho)
 Camilo Opeña (PhD Ohio State University)
 Chad Patrick Osorio (MBLE Aix-Marseille University)
 Isabelita Pabuayon (PhD Kansas State University)
 Tirso Paris (PhD Michigan State University)
 Ma. Eden Piadozo (PhD Tokyo University of Agriculture)
 Cesar Quicoy (PhD UPLB)
 Roberto Rañola, Jr. (PhD University of Minnesota)
 Corazon Rapera (PhD Virginia Tech)
 U-Primo Rodriguez (MA Australian National University)
 Asa Jose Sajise (PhD University of California, Berkeley)
 Reynaldo Tan (PhD University of Tsukuba)
 Arvin Vista (PhD Oregon State University)
 Jose Yorobe (PhD UPLB)
 Antonio Jesus Quilloy (PhD UPLB)

Degree programs

 BS Agribusiness Management and Entrepreneurship Majors: Agribusiness Entrepreneurship, Agribusiness Management
BS Agricultural EconomicsMajors: Production Economics and Farm Management, Marketing and Price Analysis, Policy and Development, Agricultural Finance and Cooperatives
 BS EconomicsMajors: Development Economics, Environmental Economics
 MS EconomicsMajors: Economics of Development, Quantitative Economics
 Master of ManagementMajors: Agribusiness Management, Business Management
 PhD Agricultural Economics Majors: Production Economics and Farm Management, Marketing and Price Analysis, Policy and Development, Natural Resource Economics, Agricultural Finance and Cooperatives

Notable alumni 

 Jikun Huang (PhD) - Director, Center for Chinese Agricultural Policy
 Linxiu Zhang (PhD) - Director, Stanford Rural Education Action Project and Deputy Director, Center for Chinese Agricultural Policy 
 William Meyers (MS) - Professor, University of Missouri and director, Food and Agricultural Policy Research Institute 
 Maria (Sergy) Floro (Former faculty) - Professor at American University
 PA Samaratunga (PhD) - Head (Agricultural Economics), Sri Lanka Institute of Policy Studies 
 Jonna P. Estudillo (BS, MS) - Professor, Graduate Research Institute of Policy Studies (Japan)
 Joseph Salvacruz (BS) - Professor at Hong Kong University of Science and Technology Business School 
 Cielito Habito (BS/Faculty) - Former Secretary of Socio-Economic Planning and Director General of National Economic and Development Authority
 Arsenio Balisacan (MS) - Current secretary of Socio-Economic Planning and Director General of National Economic and Development Authority; Dean of UP School of Economics in  Diliman
 Juan Miguel Zubiri (BS) - Senator, 14th (2007–2010), 15th (2010–2011) and 17th Congress of the Philippines (2016–present)
 Carlito Añonuevo (Former faculty) - former president of Action For Economic Reforms

References

College of Economics and Management website

Economics
Educational institutions established in 1975